"The Little Drummer Boy" (originally known as "Carol of the Drum") is a popular Christmas song written by American composer Katherine Kennicott Davis in 1941. First recorded in 1951 by the Trapp Family, the song was further popularized by a 1958 recording by the Harry Simeone Chorale; the Simeone version was re-released successfully for several years, and the song has been recorded many times since.
In the lyrics, the singer relates how, as a poor young boy, he was summoned by the Magi to the Nativity of Jesus. Without a gift for the Infant, the little drummer boy played his drum with approval from Jesus's mother, Mary, recalling, "I played my best for him" and "He smiled at me".

Origins and history

The song was originally titled "Carol of the Drum". While speculation has been made that the song is very loosely based on the Czech carol "Hajej, nynjej", the chair of the music department at Davis's alma mater Wellesley College claims otherwise. In an interview with Music Department Chair Claire Fontijn, the College writes:

Davis's interest was in producing material for amateur and girls' choirs: Her manuscript is set as a chorale, in which the tune is in the soprano melody with alto harmony, tenor and bass parts producing the "drum rhythm" and a keyboard accompaniment "for rehearsal only". It is headed "Czech Carol freely transcribed by K.K.D.", these initials then crossed out and replaced with "C.R.W. Robinson", a name under which Davis sometimes published.

"Carol of the Drum" appealed to the Austrian Trapp Family Singers, who first brought the song to wider prominence when they recorded it for Decca Records in 1951 on their first album for the label. Their version was credited solely to Davis and published by Belwin-Mills.

In 1957, the song was recorded with an altered arrangement by Jack Halloran for his Jack Halloran Singers on their Dot Records album Christmas Is A-Comin'''. This arrangement is the one commonly sung today. However, the recording was not released as a single that year. In response to this, Dot producer Henry Onorati, who left Dot to become the new head of 20th Century-Fox Records in 1958, introduced the song to Harry Simeone. When 20th Century-Fox Records contracted with Simeone to record a Christmas album, Simeone hired many of the same singers that had sung in Halloran's version and made a near-identical recording with his newly created Harry Simeone Chorale. It was released as a single in 1958, and later on the album, Sing We Now of Christmas, later retitled The Little Drummer Boy. The only difference between Simeone's and Halloran's versions, was that Simeone's contained finger cymbals, and the song's title had been changed to "The Little Drummer Boy".  Simeone and Onorati claimed and received joint composition credits with Davis, although the two did not actually compose or arrange it. Halloran never received a joint writing credit for the song, something his family disagrees with.Estrella, E. (8 February 2019). How the 'Little Drummer Boy' Christmas Carol Came to Be.

The album and the song were an enormous success, with the single scoring in the top 40 of the U.S. music charts from 1958 to 1962. In 1965, Simeone, who had signed with Kapp Records in 1964, re-recorded a new version of the song for his album O' Bambino: The Little Drummer Boy. This version (3:18 play time) was recorded in stereo, had a slightly slower tempo, and contained different-sounding cymbals. Simeone recorded the song a third and final time in 1981 (3:08 play time), for an album, again titled The Little Drummer Boy, on the budget Holiday Records label.

Renditions

"The Little Drummer Boy" has been recorded by many artists, such as:
 Royal Scots Dragoon Guards, whose version got to No. 13 in the UK charts at Christmas 1972
 Jazz/funk musician Stix Hooper, drummer and percussionist for the group The Crusaders, who recorded the song in 1979 as the final track on The World Within, his first album as a lead artist.
 Pop group Boney M., who recorded a version of the song for their 1981 Christmas Album. The single peaked at No. 20 in Germany.
 Also in 1981, a pop punk/Hard rock version served as the final track on Joan Jett and the Blackhearts's album I Love Rock 'n Roll. Jett's version includes a modification of the traditional lyrics of "Ox and lamb" to "Ass and lamb" and another line, traditionally "Mary nodded," is rendered in apparent nonsense words. Besides these and a climactic electric guitar breakdown, the song is otherwise performed fairly earnestly.
 A duet by the unusual pairing of Bing Crosby and David Bowie on Crosby's final holiday TV special (Bing Crosby's Merrie Olde Christmas, 1977) as a medley titled "Peace on Earth/Little Drummer Boy". In 1982 it reached No. 3 on the UK chart.
 Ringo Starr included a version of the song on his 1999 holiday album I Wanna Be Santa Claus. 
 Terry Wogan and Aled Jones recorded a cover of the 1977 David Bowie/Bing Crosby duet, "Peace on Earth/Little Drummer Boy"; after a brief campaign amongst listeners of BBC Radio 2 instigated by Chris Evans to get the song released in support of the Children In Need charity, it was released as a single on 8 December 2008, reaching No. 3 in the UK Top 40 singles chart.
 Norwegian electronic musician Hans-Peter Lindstrøm recorded a 42-minute version of the song in 2009. In 2019, The Guardian placed it at number 20 on their list of the 50 greatest Christmas songs.
 Justin Bieber released a version of the song, simply named "Drummer Boy", with Busta Rhymes on his 2011 Christmas album, Under the Mistletoe, adding rap verses. The song is listed among the Greatest of All Time Holiday 100 Songs chart by Billboard.
 The cast of Glee recorded a version that rose to number 31 on Billboard Holiday Digital Songs chart in 2011.
 Pentatonix released it as a digital single, in 2013, which both debuted and peaked at No. 13 on the Billboard Hot 100 chart.
 The band For King & Country recorded a popular version, their 2017 album A Drummer Boy Christmas was nominated and won a GMA Dove Award for Christmas / Special Event Album of the Year.
 American violinist Lindsey Stirling released a cover for this song in her 2022 album Snow Waltz''.

See also
 List of Christmas carols

References

External links

1941 songs
20th Century Fox Records singles
American Christmas songs
Christmas carols
Songs about children
Songs about drums
Songs about Jesus
Songs about musicians